Ensign Daniel Fisher (1618-1683) was a politician from Dedham, Massachusetts and Speaker of the Massachusetts House of Deputies.

Personal life

Fisher was baptized in Syleham, Suffolk, England in 1618. He came to Massachusetts with his father, Anthony Fisher, and his cousin Joshua Fisher, aboard the ship Rose. He was married in 1641 in Dedham to Abigail Marrett and together they had seven children. Fisher's father, Anthony, and son, Daniel, also served in the Great and General Court. His son was said to be his "heir to his energetic ardor in the cause of freedom."

He was a member of the First Church and Parish in Dedham. He died in 1683. The Fisher School, now in Westwood, Massachusetts, was named in his honor.

Public service

Fisher served in the Great and General Court of Massachusetts as a representative from Dedham. Being elected to the post showed the great esteem in which the people of Dedham held Fisher as it was the one body the townsmen recognized as superior to their own Town Meeting.

In colonial Massachusetts, each town sent two deputies to the General Court each year. Fisher was one of ten men who served in the role from the time of the Town's founding in 1636 to 1686 and, after 1650 was one of three, including Eleazer Lusher and Joshua Fisher, who "virtually monopolized the post." In 1671, he and Joshua were among a small minority of the General Court who voted against giving doctrinal authority to clergy.

He was elected Speaker of the Massachusetts House of Deputies in 1680 and served in the role for three years. After serving in the House of Deputies, Fisher was elected to the Massachusetts Council of Assistants, a body in rank just below the Governor and Deputy Governor.

Fisher was also elected to serve as a Selectman in Dedham in 1650. In total, he served in this post for 32 years. On May 27, 1647, he gave a parcel of land to the Town for use as an animal pound but reserved the right to cut the trees on it. With his sister, Lydia, he helped to hide the regicides Edward Whalley and William Goffe after they sought asylum in America in 1660.

Fisher and Eleazer Lusher were sent to purchase land from the Pocomtuc Indians who lived in what is today Deerfield, Massachusetts.

References

Works cited

Members of the colonial Massachusetts General Court from Dedham
1618 births
1683 deaths
Dedham, Massachusetts selectmen
Kingdom of England emigrants to Massachusetts Bay Colony